Kogarah Bay is a suburb in southern Sydney, in the state of New South Wales, Australia 16 kilometres south of the Sydney central business district. It is part of the St George area. Kogarah Bay is in the local government area of the Georges River Council.

Kogarah Bay takes its name from the small bay on the northern shore of the Georges River. The suburb is surrounded by the suburbs of Carss Park, Blakehurst, Carlton, Beverley Park and Sans Souci. A small group of shops is located on the intersection of Park Road and the Princes Highway.

History
Kogarah is from an aboriginal word meaning rushes or place of reeds. It had also been written as 'coggera' or 'cogerah' but the current spelling was settled when the railway line came through the area in the 1880s. Kogarah Bay and Beverley Park were originally part of the suburb of Kogarah.

Parks
Harold Frazer Reserve, Parkside Drive Reserve

Churches
Kogarah Bay Congregational Church

Population
According to the 2016 Australian Bureau of Statistics Census of Population, there were 2,022 people usually resident in Kogarah Bay. 66.4% of people were born in Australia. 50.1% of people only spoke English at home. Other languages spoken at home included Greek 14.0%, Arabic 6.9% and Cantonese 5.2%. The most common responses for religious affiliation were Catholic 25.7%, Eastern Orthodox 24.2%, No Religion 14.1% and Anglican 8.2%.

References

Suburbs of Sydney
Bays of New South Wales
Georges River Council